The Tomb of Ptahmes is a sepulchre in the necropolis of Saqqara, Egypt. Located on the side of the Pyramid of Unas, it was built in the 13th century BC during the 19th Dynasty of the New Kingdom of Egypt. The tomb belonged to Ptahmes, a high ranking official under pharaoh Seti I and his successor Ramesses II.

Discovery 
The tomb was discovered by treasure hunters in 1885. Most of the tomb's artifacts ended up in museums in the Netherlands, Italy and the United States. Its location was not recorded however, so knowledge of its position was lost when it was again covered over time by the desert sands. It was rediscovered in 2010 by archaeologists from Cairo University. They discovered more artifacts which include several stelas (grave markers) including an unfinished image of Ptahmes himself. Another shows his family before the Theban Triad of Amun, Mut and Khonsu, three deities popular at the time. A painted head of Ptahmes' daughter or wife was also found, alongside shabti figurines, amulets and clay vessels. Ptahmes' sarcophagus has not yet been found and work continues to find the tomb's main shaft and burial chamber.

Several broken jars were found on the site. In some of them the contained solidified material was analyzed through advanced proteomic techniques by scientists of the University of Catania in Italy in collaboration with the archaeologists of the Cairo University. The results showed that the content was probably a hard cheese of bovine and sheep-goat origin. At the time of analyses, it was found to be the oldest solid cheese ever discovered and analyzed with modern scientific and technical protocols. This makes the site notable in the history of the evolution of food technology.

Layout 
The tomb is over 70 meters long and features several chapels. During the Christian period of Egypt some of its pillars were reused for churches. Its walls were damaged when it was accessed in 1885.

Ptahmes 
The hieroglyphs in the tomb state that Ptahmes held several important titles during the reign of Seti I, which include mayor of Egypt's capital city Memphis, army chief, overseer of the treasury and royal scribe under Seti I. Under Seti I's son Ramesses II he was promoted to the office of High Priest of Amun at Karnak.

References

Sources 

Buildings and structures completed in the 13th century BC
Tombs of ancient Egypt
1885 archaeological discoveries
2010 archaeological discoveries
13th-century BC establishments in Egypt